Aurelius Township is one of the twenty-two townships of Washington County, Ohio, United States.  The 2000 census found 441 people in the township, 239 of whom lived in the unincorporated portions of the township.

Geography
Located in the far northern part of the county, it borders the following townships:
Jefferson Township, Noble County - north
Salem Township - south
Adams Township - southwest corner
Jackson Township, Noble County - west

The village of Macksburg is located in northern Aurelius Township.

Name and history
It is the only Aurelius Township statewide.

Government
The township is governed by a three-member board of trustees, who are elected in November of odd-numbered years to a four-year term beginning on the following January 1. Two are elected in the year after the presidential election and one is elected in the year before it. There is also an elected township fiscal officer, who serves a four-year term beginning on April 1 of the year after the election, which is held in November of the year before the presidential election. Vacancies in the fiscal officership or on the board of trustees are filled by the remaining trustees.

References

External links
County website

Townships in Washington County, Ohio
Townships in Ohio